Torre Bouchard is a 30-story high skyscraper in Buenos Aires, Argentina. The building houses offices for several international companies, such as The Boston Consulting Group, Weatherford, and Aerolíneas Argentinas. The World Bank has also placed its Argentina offices in the tower.

The building was designed in 1991 by SEPRA Arquitectos, a local architectural firm whose stamp is on numerous other high-rises in the Catalinas Norte office park. The Bouchard Tower was inaugurated in 1996 and is 110 m (361 ft) high, and includes 36,025 m2 (388,000 ft²) of indoor space.

References

Skyscraper office buildings in Argentina
Buildings and structures in Buenos Aires
Aerolíneas Argentinas
Office buildings completed in 1994
1994 establishments in Argentina